ETS or ets may refer to:

Climate change, environment and economy
 Emissions trading scheme
 European Union Emission Trading Scheme

Organisations
 European Thermoelectric Society
 Evangelical Theological Society

Education
 École de technologie supérieure, an engineering school in Montreal, Canada
 Educational Testing Service, an American assessment organization
 Educational and Training Services Branch, of the British Army
 European Theological Seminary, in Kniebis, Germany

Science and technology
 Endoscopic thoracic sympathectomy
 Enhanced Transmission Selection
 Enterprise test software
 Enterprise Transport Security, in computer security
 Environmental tobacco smoke
 Episodic tremor and slip
 ETS transcription factor family
 External transcribed spacer

Transport
 East Tsim Sha Tsui station, of the  Mass Transit Railway, Hong Kong
 Edmonton Transit Service, Alberta, Canada
 Electric train supply, which powers auxiliary systems on rail vehicles
 Enterprise Municipal Airport (Alabama)
 Eureka Transit Service, California, US
 Euskal Trenbide Sarea, a railway infrastructure company in the Basque Country, Spain
 KTM ETS, a high-speed train service in Malaysia

Other uses
 Afenmai language (ISO 639-3 code)
 European Training Strategy, of the European Commission
 Marie Hall Ets (1895–1984), American writer and illustrator
 Expiration of Term of Service, in US military separation